In mathematics, Mathieu functions, sometimes called angular Mathieu functions, are solutions of Mathieu's differential equation

They were first introduced by Émile Léonard Mathieu, who encountered them while studying vibrating elliptical drumheads. They have applications in many fields of the physical sciences, such as optics, quantum mechanics, and general relativity. They tend to occur in problems involving periodic motion, or in the analysis of partial differential equation boundary value problems possessing elliptic symmetry.

Definition

Mathieu functions 

They are sometimes also referred to as cosine-elliptic and sine-elliptic, or Mathieu functions of the first kind.

As a result of assuming that  is real, both the characteristic numbers and associated functions are real-valued.

 and  can be further classified by parity and periodicity (both with respect to ), as follows:

{| class="wikitable"
! Function !! Parity  !! Period
|-
| 
| even
| 
|-
| 
| even
| 
|-
| 
| odd
| 
|- 
| 
| odd
| 
|}

Modified Mathieu functions 

Closely related are the modified Mathieu functions, also known as radial Mathieu functions, which are solutions of Mathieu's modified differential equation

which can be related to the original Mathieu equation by taking .

These functions are real-valued when  is real.

Normalization 

A common normalization, which will be adopted throughout this article, is to demand

Floquet theory 

Many properties of the Mathieu differential equation can be deduced from the general theory of ordinary differential equations with periodic coefficients, called Floquet theory. The central result is Floquet's theorem:

Note, however, that the theorem only guarantees the existence of at least one solution satisfying , when Mathieu's equation in fact has two independent solutions for any given , . This result can be formally stated as Ince's theorem:

An equivalent statement of Floquet's theorem is that Mathieu's equation admits a complex-valued solution of form
 
An example  is plotted to the right.

Other types of Mathieu functions

Second kind 

Since Mathieu's equation is a second order differential equation, one can construct two linearly independent solutions. Floquet's theory says that if  is equal to a characteristic number, one of these solutions can be taken to be periodic, and the other nonperiodic.

Fractional order 

(See Ince's Theorem above.)

These classifications are summarized in the table below. The modified Mathieu function counterparts are defined similarly.

{| class="wikitable" 
|+Classification of Mathieu functions
|-
! Order !! First kind  !! Second kind
|-
| Integral
| 
| 
|-
| Integral
| 
| 
|-
| Fractional
( non-integral)
| 
| 
|}

Explicit representation and computation

First kind 
Mathieu functions of the first kind can be represented as Fourier series:

By substitution into the Mathieu equation, they can be shown to obey three-term recurrence relations in the lower index. For instance, for each  one finds

Being a second-order recurrence in the index , one can always find two independent solutions  and  such that the general solution can be expressed as a linear combination of the two: . Moreover, in this particular case, an asymptotic analysis shows that one possible choice of fundamental solutions has the property

In particular,  is finite whereas  diverges.

In general, however, the solution of a three-term recurrence with variable coefficients
cannot be represented in a simple manner, and hence there is no simple way to determine  from the condition 
. Moreover, even if the approximate value of a characteristic number is known, it cannot be used to obtain the coefficients  by numerically iterating the recurrence towards increasing . The reason is that as long as  only approximates a characteristic number,  is not identically  and the divergent solution  eventually dominates for large enough .

To overcome these issues, more sophisticated semi-analytical/numerical approaches are required, for instance using a continued fraction expansion, casting the recurrence as a matrix eigenvalue problem, or implementing a backwards recurrence algorithm. The complexity of the three-term recurrence relation is one of the reasons there are few simple formulas and identities involving Mathieu functions.

In practice, Mathieu functions and the corresponding characteristic numbers can be calculated using pre-packaged software, such as Mathematica, Maple, MATLAB, and SciPy.

Second kind 

There are several ways to represent Mathieu functions of the second kind. One representation is in terms of Bessel functions:

Modified functions 
A traditional approach for numerical evaluation of the modified Mathieu functions is through Bessel function product series.

Properties 

There are relatively few analytic expressions and identities involving Mathieu functions. Moreover, unlike many other special functions, the solutions of Mathieu's equation cannot in general be expressed in terms of hypergeometric functions. This can be seen by transformation of Mathieu's equation to algebraic form, using the change of variable :

Since this equation has an irregular singular point at infinity, it cannot be transformed into an equation of the hypergeometric type.

Qualitative behavior 

For arbitrary , they may deviate significantly from their trigonometric counterparts; however, they remain periodic in general.

For  and as  the modified Mathieu functions tend to behave as damped periodic functions.

Reflections and translations 

Due to their parity and periodicity,  and   have simple properties under reflections and translations by multiples of :

One can also write functions with negative  in terms of those with positive :

Moreover,

Orthogonality and completeness 

Moreover, with  fixed and  treated as the eigenvalue, the Mathieu equation is of Sturm–Liouville form.

Integral identities 

Solutions of Mathieu's equation satisfy a class of integral identities with respect to kernels  that are solutions of

 solves 
 has the same value at the endpoints of 

Using an appropriate change of variables, the equation for  can be transformed into the wave equation and solved. Examples of identities obtained in this way are

Identities of the latter type are useful for studying asymptotic properties of the modified Mathieu functions.

There also exist integral relations between functions of the first and second kind, for instance:

valid for any complex  and real .

Asymptotic expansions 

Thus, the modified Mathieu functions decay exponentially for large real argument.

For the even and odd periodic Mathieu functions  and the associated characteristic numbers   one can also derive asymptotic expansions for large . For the characteristic numbers in particular, one has with  approximately an odd integer, i.e. 

Terms of this expansion have been obtained explicitly up to and including the term of order . Here  is only approximately an odd integer because in the limit of  all minimum segments of the periodic potential  become effectively independent harmonic oscillators (hence  an odd integer). By decreasing , tunneling through the barriers becomes possible (in physical language), leading to a splitting of the characteristic numbers  (in quantum mechanics called eigenvalues) corresponding to even and odd periodic Mathieu functions. This splitting  is obtained with boundary conditions (in quantum mechanics this provides the splitting of the eigenvalues into energy bands). The boundary conditions are:

Imposing these boundary conditions on the asymptotic periodic Mathieu functions associated with the above expansion for  one obtains

The corresponding characteristic numbers or eigenvalues then follow by expansion, i.e.

Insertion of the appropriate expressions above yields the result

 (i.e. with lower, plus sign).

Similar asymptotic expansions can be obtained for the solutions of other periodic differential equations, as for Lamé functions and prolate and oblate spheroidal wave functions.

Applications 

Mathieu's differential equations appear in a wide range of contexts in engineering, physics, and applied mathematics. Many of these applications fall into one of two general categories: 1) the analysis of partial differential equations in elliptic geometries, and 2) dynamical problems which involve forces that are periodic in either space or time. Examples within both categories are discussed below.

Partial differential equations 

Mathieu functions arise when separation of variables in elliptic coordinates is applied to 1) the Laplace equation in 3 dimensions, and 2) the Helmholtz equation in either 2 or 3 dimensions. Since the Helmholtz equation is a prototypical equation for modeling the spatial variation of classical waves, Mathieu functions can be used to describe a variety of wave phenomena. For instance, in computational electromagnetics they can be used to analyze the scattering of electromagnetic waves off elliptic cylinders, and wave propagation in elliptic waveguides. In general relativity, an exact plane wave solution to the Einstein field equation can be given in terms of Mathieu functions.

More recently, Mathieu functions have been used to solve a special case of the Smoluchowski equation, describing the steady-state statistics of self-propelled particles.

The remainder of this section details the analysis for the two-dimensional Helmholtz equation. In rectangular coordinates, the Helmholtz equation is

Elliptic coordinates are defined by

The Helmholtz equation in these coordinates is

The constant  curves are confocal ellipses with focal length ; hence, these coordinates are convenient for solving the Helmholtz equation on domains with elliptic boundaries. Separation of variables via  yields the Mathieu equations

where  is a separation constant.

As a specific physical example, the Helmholtz equation can be interpreted as describing normal modes of an elastic membrane under uniform tension. In this case, the following physical conditions are imposed:
Continuity of displacement across the interfocal line: 
Continuity of derivative across the interfocal line: 

For instance, clamping the membrane at  imposes , which in turn requires

These conditions define the normal modes of the system.

Dynamical problems 

In dynamical problems with periodically varying forces, the equation of motion sometimes takes the form of Mathieu's equation. In such cases, knowledge of the general properties of Mathieu's equation— particularly with regard to stability of the solutions—can be essential for understanding qualitative features of the physical dynamics. A classic example along these lines is the inverted pendulum. Other examples are
vibrations of a string with periodically varying tension
stability of railroad rails as trains drive over them
seasonally forced population dynamics
the phenomenon of parametric resonance in forced oscillators
motion of ions in a quadrupole ion trap
the Stark effect for a rotating electric dipole
 the Floquet theory of the stability of limit cycles

Quantum mechanics 
Mathieu functions play a role in certain quantum mechanical systems, particularly those with spatially periodic potentials such as the quantum pendulum and crystalline lattices.

The modified Mathieu equation also arises when describing the quantum mechanics of singular potentials. For the particular singular potential  the radial Schrödinger equation
 
can be converted into the equation
 
The transformation is achieved with the following substitutions
 
By solving the Schrödinger equation (for this particular potential) in terms of solutions of the modified Mathieu equation, scattering properties such as the S-matrix and the absorptivity can be obtained.

See also
List of mathematical functions
Hill differential equation
Lamé function
Monochromatic electromagnetic plane wave
Inverted pendulum
Bessel function

Notes

References

 
 
 
 
 

 
 
 
 
 
 
  Note: Reprinted lithographically in Great Britain at the University Press, Oxford, 1951 from corrected sheets of the (1947) first edition.
 
 
 
 
 
 
 

 
  (free online access to the appendix on Mathieu functions)

External links
 
 List of equations and identities for Mathieu Functions functions.wolfram.com
 
 Timothy Jones, Mathieu's Equations and the Ideal rf-Paul Trap (2006)
 Mathieu equation, EqWorld
NIST Digital Library of Mathematical Functions: Mathieu Functions and Hill's Equation

Ordinary differential equations
Special functions